Li Guohua (born March 1960) is a retired Chinese business executive who served as general manager of China Unicom from 2018 to 2022, chairman of the Postal Savings Bank of China from 2012 to 2018, and general manager of China Post from 2011 to 2018. He was investigated by China's top anti-graft agency in February 2022.

Early life and education
Li was born in De'an County, Jiangxi, in March 1960. In September 1977, he became a sent-down youth in his home-county. In October 1978, he entered Jiangxi Post and Telecommunications School, majoring in signal carrier. He also studied at Nanchang University, Poitiers University and the Central Party School of the Chinese Communist Party as a part-time student.

Career in postal system
After graduating in 1981, he was despatched to the De'an County Post and Telecommunications Administration and one year later was transferred to Jiujiang Post and Telecommunications Bureau, where he was eventually became deputy director in May 1992. He joined the Chinese Communist Party (CCP) in November 1983. He became director of Fuzhou Post and Telecommunications Bureau in November 1994, and served until December 1996. In December 1996, he became deputy director of Jiangxi Post Bureau, rising to director in July 1999. In July 2005, he was assigned to deputy director of the State Post Bureau. He served as deputy general manager of China Post in November 2006, and five years later promoted to the general manager position. In January 2021, he concurrently served as chairman of the Postal Savings Bank of China.

Career in China Unicom
On 19 July 2018, he was promoted to become general manager of China Unicom, serving in the post until his retirement on 11 March 2020.

Downfall
On 18 February 2022, he was put under investigation for alleged "serious violations of discipline and laws" by the Central Commission for Discipline Inspection (CCDI), the party's internal disciplinary body, and the National Supervisory Commission, the highest anti-corruption agency of China. On 30 September, he was expelled from the Communist Party. On November 4, the Supreme People's Procuratorate signed an arrest order for him for taking bribes. On November 4, he was arrested for suspected bribe taking by the Supreme People's Procuratorate.

References

1960 births
Living people
People from De'an County
Nanchang University alumni
Central Party School of the Chinese Communist Party alumni
Expelled members of the Chinese Communist Party
Chinese chief executives
21st-century Chinese businesspeople